Shadow Creek High School is a public high school in the Shadow Creek Ranch area of Pearland, Texas, in Greater Houston. A part of the Alvin Independent School District (AISD), SCHS was established in 2016. The mascot is the shark.

The school was named after its location in Shadow Creek Ranch.

Previously SCHS's boundary included a northeast portion of Manvel.

History
It was originally known as "High School 3" but members of Alvin ISD's board of trustees approved the current name in February 2014. Gamma Construction built the facility; the scheduled beginning of construction was February 2014, and it was completed in August 2016.

Athletics
Shadow Creek High School has a developed athletics program including a total of 13 sports. The school is competitive on a district level.

Football
2018 State finalist (5A/D1)
2019 State champion (5A/D1)

References

External links

Shadow Creek High School Band

Schools in Pearland, Texas
Alvin Independent School District high schools
Public high schools in Texas
2016 establishments in Texas
Educational institutions established in 2016